Acharagma roseanum is a succulent cactus native to a small area of mountains of southeastern Coahuila and Nuevo León, Mexico. It grows on rocky limestone hills and xerophytic shrubland. Its name is often misspelled as "Roseana".

Description
Acharagma roseanum forms individual, small, soft bodied cacti that form clusters over time.
The plant's specific physical characteristics are:
The flowers are pink to bronze flowers on the top of the stem,  in diameter.

References

Cactoideae
Flora of Coahuila
Flora of Nuevo León